The 2014–15 Big East Conference men's basketball season began with practices in October 2014, followed by the start of the followed by the start of the 2014–15 NCAA Division I men's basketball season in November.  This is the 36th year in the conference's history, but the second as a non-football conference, which officially formed on July 1, 2013.  While the first game involving two conference members took place during the Battle 4 Atlantis, it did not count in the Big East standings; conference play officially began on New Year's Eve 2014. The season concluded in March with the 2015 Big East tournament at Madison Square Garden in New York City.

Preseason

() first place votes

Preseason All-Big East teams

Rankings

Regular season
This table summarizes the head-to-head results between teams in conference play.

Honors and awards

All-Americans

All-Big East awards and teams

Coaches

Postseason

Big East tournament

  March 11–14, 2015 Big East Conference Basketball Tournament, Madison Square Garden, New York City.

Bracket

* denotes overtime game

NCAA tournament

* denotes overtime game

References

External links
Big East website